was a railway station on the Hakodate Main Line operated by Hokkaido Railway Company (JR Hokkaido) in Mori, Kayabe District, Oshima Subprefecture, Hokkaido, Japan. This station permanently closed on March 4, 2017.

See also
Katsuragawa Station (Kyoto)

References

Railway stations in Hokkaido Prefecture
Railway stations in Japan opened in 1944
Railway stations closed in 2017
Defunct railway stations in Japan